550 East State Street is a historic building in Savannah, Georgia, United States. It is located in the northeastern tything of Greene Square and was built in 1854. It is also known as Joseph Burke House, and is part of the Savannah Historic District. Joseph Burke, a native of Wicklow, Ireland, was a commission merchant and exchange broker. He had offices in one of John Stoddard's buildings on River Street.

In a survey for Historic Savannah Foundation, Mary Lane Morrison found the building to be of significant status.

See also
Buildings in Savannah Historic District

References

Houses in Savannah, Georgia
Houses completed in 1854
Greene Square (Savannah) buildings